Qareh Aghaj Rud (also Romanized as Qareh Āghāj Rūd; also known as Qarah Āghāj) is a village in Soluk Rural District, in the Central District of Hashtrud County, East Azerbaijan Province, Iran. As of the 2006 census, its population was 24, in four families.

References 

Towns and villages in Hashtrud County